Nicky Samuels (born 28 February 1983) is a New Zealand professional triathlete who has won the 2013 XTERRA Triathlon World Championship and the 2012 ITU Aquathlon World Championships. She is also the 2012 New Zealand cycling road race national champion. She represented—alongside Andrea Hewitt—New Zealand at the 2016 Summer Olympics in triathlon and came 13th.

Professional career

Achievements

 2016 Olympic Games, Rio de Janeiro, Brazil 13th individual race
 2014 Commonwealth Games, Glasgow, Scotland. 5th team race
 2014 Commonwealth Games, Glasgow, Scotland. 10th individual race
 2014 Xterra World Championships Maui, Hawaii. 3rd
 2014 ITU Triathlon World Series Grand Final Edmonton, Canada. 3rd
 2014 ITU Triathlon World Series Stockholm, Sweden. 3rd
 2014 ITU Triathlon World Series London, Great Britain. 5th
 2014 OTU Sprint triathlon Oceania cup, New Zealand. 1st
 2013 Xterra World Championships Maui, Hawaii. 1st
 2013 ITU Triathlon World Series Kitzbuehel, Austria. 5th
 2013 ITU Triathlon World Series Auckland, New Zealand. 5th
 2012 ITU Triathlon World cup Tongyeong, Korea. 1st
 2012 ITU Triathlon World Series Kitzbuehel, Austria. 6th
 2012 Olympic Games, London, Great Britain. 33rd individual race
 2012 ITU Aquathlon World Championship. 1st
 2012  New Zealand Road Race cycling Champion
 2010 Bronze Oceania Championships, Wellington NZ
 2010, 2009, 2008 New Zealand Triathlon Series Champion (Contact Cup)
 2010 NZ National Sprint distance Champion
 2009 NZ National Sprint distance Champion
 2009 Central Otago Sports Women of the year
 2009 Bronze Oceania Champs, Gold Coast Australia
 2009 Silver Medal Oceania Cup, New Plymouth, New Zealand
 2009 4th Place ITU World Cup Mooloolaba Australia
 2008 Bronze Oceania Champs, Wellington NZ
 2008 NZ Olympic Distance National Champion
 2007 4th place Madrid ITU World Cup, Spain
 2007 Bronze ITU  World Cup Kitzbuhel, Austria
 2006 Bronze U23 Elite World Championships, Lausanne, Switzerland

References

External links

 Official website
 International Triathlon Union profile

 

1983 births
Living people
New Zealand female triathletes
Triathletes at the 2012 Summer Olympics
Olympic triathletes of New Zealand
New Zealand female cyclists
Triathletes at the 2014 Commonwealth Games
Triathletes at the 2016 Summer Olympics
Commonwealth Games competitors for New Zealand
20th-century New Zealand women
21st-century New Zealand women